Rajeev Ram and Joe Salisbury defeated Max Purcell and Luke Saville in the final, 6–4, 6–2 to win the men's doubles tennis title at the 2020 Australian Open. Purcell and Saville had entered the tournament through a wildcard.

Pierre-Hugues Herbert and Nicolas Mahut were the defending champions, but were defeated in the first round by Simone Bolelli and Benoît Paire.

Marcelo Arévalo became the first Salvadoran to reach a major quarterfinal.

Seeds

Draw

Finals

Top half

Section 1

Section 2

Bottom half

Section 3

Section 4

Other entry information

Wild cards

Alternate pairs

Withdrawals
  Radu Albot /  Denys Molchanov (Albot withdrew due to personal reasons)
  Márton Fucsovics /  Cameron Norrie (Fucsovics withdrew due to focusing on singles match)

References

External links
Draw
 2020 Australian Open – Men's draws and results at the International Tennis Federation

Men's Doubles
Australian Open (tennis) by year – Men's doubles